The Wolf House is a Chilean stop-motion animated horror film directed by Cristobal León & Joaquín Cociña and co-written with Alejandra Moffat.

It had its world premiere at the 68th Berlin International Film Festival in the section Forum on February 22, 2018.

Plot

María, a young woman, finds refuge in a house in the south of Chile after escaping from a sect of German religious fanatics. She is welcomed into the home by two pigs, the only inhabitants of the place. Like in a dream, the universe of the house reacts to Maria’s feelings. The animals transform slowly into humans, and the house becomes a nightmarish world. Inspired by the actual case of Colonia Dignidad, “The Wolf House” masquerades as an animated fairy tale produced by the leader of the sect in order to indoctrinate its followers.

Cast
 Amalia Kassai	as María
 Rainer Krause	as Wolf

Production
For its production, it received support from several projects including the Chile Fund for Film Project Development and the FONDART from the National Council of Culture and the Arts.

Filming
The film was shot in several studios and exhibitions at museums of different cities from Latin America and Europe including the Upstream Gallery in Amsterdam, Netherlands, the Kampnagel in Hamburg, Germany and the Chilean National Museum of Fine Arts in Santiago, Chile.

Release
It had its world premiere at the 68th Berlin International Film Festival on February 22, 2018. It was also screened at the Annecy International Animation Film Festival where it won the Jury Distinction, the Monterrey International Film Festival and other Chilean festivals including the Valdivia Film Festival and the Viña del Mar International Film Festival.

Reception

Critical response 
The critical consensus reads "Surreal, unsettling, and finally haunting, The Wolf House is a stunning outpouring of creativity whose striking visuals queasily complement its disturbing story." On Metacritic the film has a weighted average score of 86 out of 100, based on 9 critics, indicating "universal acclaim".

Glenn Kenny of The New York Times gave the film a positive review writing: "The film surprises, with incredible force, in every one of its 75 minutes.". Jonathan Holland of The Hollywood Reporter praised the film for its visuals, writing: "the deeply uncanny pic makes for an unsettling viewing experience, a creative tour de force whose endlessly fascinating visuals are deliberately seductive and repellent in equal measure.". David Ehrlich of IndieWire rated the film a B+, calling the film "one of the darkest animated movies ever made.".

Awards and nominations

References

External links
 

2018 films
Chilean animated films
German animated films
Chilean horror films
2010s German films